Sächsisches Landesgymnasium Sankt Afra zu Meißen is a boarding school for highly gifted students in the German city of Meissen, Saxony. Founded in 1543 as Fürstliche Landesschule and re-established in 2001, the stated aim of the school is to promote the intellectual and social development of highly gifted students. The costs for attending the school comply with the maxim of social balance; the boarding and schooling fees are considerably low in contrast to similar institutions. It is the first publicly funded school for highly gifted students in Germany and is a role model for similar schools.

The school has no official English name. Its German name translates to "Saxon State Gymnasium Saint Afra in Meissen", and is derived from the former Augustinian monastery of the Canons Regular that had been built around the local Saint Afra church.

Notable students and professors

Students 
 Petrus Albinus
 Karl Salomo Zachariae von Lingenthal
 Christian Fürchtegott Gellert
 Gottlieb Wilhelm Rabener
 Gotthold Ephraim Lessing
 Samuel Hahnemann
 Friedrich Naumann
 Ernst Schnabel
 Wilhelm Knabe

Professors 
 Georg Fabricius - Rector (1546-1571)

See also 

Landesgymnasium für Hochbegabte Schwäbisch Gmünd in Baden-Württemberg
Internatsschule Schloss Hansenberg in Hesse
Landesschule Pforta in Saxony-Anhalt
Gymnasium St. Augustine in Grimma, Saxony
Schnepfenthal Salzmann School in Thuringia

References 

 Opening Speech by Dr. Matthias Rößler in Meißen (2001)
 Portrait in the Neue Zürcher Zeitung (2007)
 Article in the Berliner Zeitung (2001)

External links
 Alumni Association

1543 establishments in the Holy Roman Empire
Educational institutions established in the 1540s
Gifted education
Boarding schools in Germany
Meissen
Schools in Saxony